Jurhum (also Banu Jurhum or The second Jurhum) historically referred to as Gorrhamite by the Greeks, was an old Arab tribe in the Arabian peninsula. Traditionally, they were a Qahtanite tribe whose historical abode was Yemen before they immigrated to Mecca.

Kaaba

According to Arabic accounts, the tribe of the Jurhum gave protection to Hagar and her son Ishmael, a relationship cemented with Ishmael's marriage to a Jurhumite woman, Rala bint Mudad ibn 'Amr ibn Jurhum ibn Himyar ibn Qahtan. The Jurhum are said to have been involved in the worship centering around the Kaaba, the holy sanctuary rebuilt by Ishmael and his father Abraham and revered as a pilgrimage site. According to one tradition, their custodianship over the Kaaba ended after they were ousted by the Khuza'a, a tribal group from the south.

Well of Zamzam

Islamic tradition further holds that Hagar and Ishmael found a spring in Mecca, the Zamzam well, from which the Jurhum wanted to drink, and that after their ousting by the Khuza'a tribe,  the Jurhum collected the treasures dedicated to the Kaaba and destroyed the Zamzam well so that nobody would find it.

See also
 Tribes of Arabia
 Ishmaelites

References

Bibliography

Further reading
 Adil Salahi (1995). Muhammad: Man and Prophet, pg. 4–8, The Islamic Foundation (UK), or Barnes & Noble (NY), or Element Books Limited, Shaftesbury, Dorset.

Tribes of Arabia
Tribes of Saudi Arabia
Yemeni tribes